Frank Hardin Jackson (born April 14, 1939) is a former American football wide receiver. He played college football at Southern Methodist University (SMU) and professionally with the American Football League's Dallas Texans/Kansas City Chiefs and the Miami Dolphins.  As a halfback, he scored four touchdowns (two rushing, two receiving) for the Texans in a 49–21 victory over the Denver Broncos in 1961.  As a wide receiver, in 1964 he caught four touchdown passes from Len Dawson in a 49–6 Chiefs defeat of the San Diego Chargers. That tied the pro football record at the time.  He was an American Football League All-Star in 1965.  He played on the Texans' 1962 AFL Championship team, winning the longest pro football game ever played up to that time in the AFL Championship game against the two-time defending AFL Champion Houston Oilers.

See also
 List of American Football League players

References

1939 births
Living people
American football halfbacks
American football wide receivers
Dallas Texans (AFL) players
Kansas City Chiefs players
Miami Dolphins players
SMU Mustangs football players
American Football League All-Star players
People from Levelland, Texas
People from Paris, Texas
Players of American football from Texas
American Football League players